Donald Allen Miller Jr. (born Don Jack Miller) is a former halfback in the National Football League. He was a member of the Green Bay Packers and the Philadelphia Eagles.

References

1932 births
Living people
American football halfbacks
Green Bay Packers players
Philadelphia Eagles players
SMU Mustangs football players
Players of American football from Houston